Al-Ahmadiyah  is a Syrian village located in Markaz Rif Dimashq, Rif Dimashq to the southeast of the al-Nashabiyah nahiyah ("subdistrict"). According to the Syria Central Bureau of Statistics (CBS), Al-Ahmadiyah had a population of 2,352 in the 2004 census.

See also

References

Populated places in Markaz Rif Dimashq District